EsaBac is a Franco-Italian secondary school double degree program, signed on 25 February 2009 by Italian Minister of Education Mariastella Gelmini, and French Minister of National Education Xavier Darcos.

The agreement, in force since September 2010, allows Italian and French students to consequently obtain two high-school degrees, Italian  and French .

See also 

 AbiBac (French-German)
BachiBac (French-Spanish)
European Baccalaureate
 French-German Baccalaureate

References

External links 

 Italian-French bilateral agreement of 24 February 2009 (in Italian)

School examinations
Secondary school qualifications
Education in Italy